Przebieczany  is a village in the administrative district of Gmina Biskupice, within Wieliczka County, Lesser Poland Voivodeship, in southern Poland.

The village has a population of 1,055.

References

Przebieczany